Marine Wing Support Squadron 174 (MWSS-174) is an aviation ground support unit of the United States Marine Corps.The squadron is based out of Marine Corps Air Station Kaneohe Bay, Hawaii and falls under the command of Marine Aircraft Group 24 and the 1st Marine Aircraft Wing.

Mission
Provide limited aviation ground support (AGS) at an expeditionary air facility and forward arming and refueling points (FARP) to enable elements of a Marine Aircraft Group and supporting or attached elements of the Marine Air Control Group (MACG) to conduct expeditionary operations.

History
Marine Wing Support Squadron 174 was originally commissioned in 1988 at Marine Corps Air Station Kaneohe Bay, Hawaii.  The squadron supported operations throughout the Persian Gulf and Pacific Region until it was decommissioned on September 8, 1994.

On November 8, 2021 Marine Wing Support Detachment 24 was redesignated as Marine Wing Support Squadron 174 as part of the Marine Corps Force Design 2030 initiative.  Force Design aligned an MWSS at each air station assigned to each Marine Aircraft Group.

Gallery

Awards
Since the beginning of World War II, the United States military has honored various units for extraordinary heroism or outstanding non-combat service. This information is compiled by the United States Marine Corps History Division and is certified by the Commandant of the Marine Corps.

See also
 United States Marine Corps Aviation
 Organization of the United States Marine Corps
 List of United States Marine Corps aviation support units

Notes

References

Web
 MWSD-24 is official, fully operational

External links
 MWSD-24's Official Website

MWSS174